Neath Indoor Market (also known as Neath General Market or simply Neath Market) is an indoor market located in the town centre of Neath, Wales.

The market building dates back to 1837. It was renovated in 1904, and most recently in 1999. Today, the market features an eclectic mix of stalls ranging from butchers and fresh vegetable stalls to hat and bag boutiques and cafes serving traditional Welsh food.

References

External links
Neath Indoor Market (official site)

Buildings and structures in Neath
Retail markets in Wales
Tourist attractions in Neath Port Talbot
Food markets in the United Kingdom